Patrick Dupré Quigley (born December 1, 1977 in New Orleans, Louisiana) is a Grammy-nominated American conductor.  Quigley is Founder and Artistic Director of Seraphic Fire. In 2010, Quigley first made national news for his viral internet campaign for his recording of Monteverdi's Vespers of 1610, which "rose to No. 1 on the iTunes classical chart the weekend of August 20th and briefly bettered a Lady Gaga album on the iTunes all-genre chart." Two of Quigley's recordings were nominated for the 54th Annual Grammy Awards: Brahms: Ein Deutsches Requiem was nominated in the "Best Choral Performance" category, and A Seraphic Fire Christmas was nominated in the "Best Chamber Music / Small Ensemble Performance" category. Quigley served as a cover conductor for the San Francisco Symphony and The Cleveland Orchestra, and has since returned to lead both ensembles.

References

External links
 Official website

1977 births
21st-century American conductors (music)
21st-century American male musicians
American classical musicians
American male conductors (music)
Living people